The United States Revenue Cutter Hamilton was one of 13 cutters of the Morris-Taney Class to be launched.  Named after Secretaries of the Treasury and Presidents of the United States, these cutters were the backbone of the Service for more than a decade.  Samuel Humphreys designed these cutters for roles as diverse as fighting pirates, privateers, combating smugglers and operating with naval forces.  He designed the vessels on a naval schooner concept.  They had Baltimore Clipper lines.  The vessels built by Webb and Allen, designed by Isaac Webb, resembled Humphreys' but had one less port.

The Hamilton, the fastest vessel in the class, was named for Founding Father Alexander Hamilton and operated out of Boston for much of her career.  She became famous for rescues and saving of property.  Josiah Sturgis was her captain for much of this time. She became well known and extremely popular, so much so that music was written entitled the "Hamilton Quick step." The Hamilton transferred to Charleston, South Carolina in 1851. She was wrecked on the Tully Breakers on 9 December 1853 with the loss of fourteen of her fifteen crew.

Notes
Citations

References cited

 
 

Schooners of the United States
1830 ships
Morris-Taney-class cutters
Maritime incidents in December 1853
Ships built in Brooklyn
Ships named for Founding Fathers of the United States